Austromitra angulata is a species of small sea snail, marine gastropod mollusc in the family Costellariidae, the ribbed miters.

Description

Distribution

References

angulata
Gastropods described in 1908